This is a list of the municipalities in the province of Córdoba in the autonomous community of Andalusia, Spain. There are 75 municipalities in the province.

See also
Geography of Spain
List of Spanish cities

 
Cordoba